Cypripedium calceolus is a lady's-slipper orchid, and the type species of the genus Cypripedium. It is native to Europe and Asia.

Taxonomy
Cypripedium comes from the Greek Κυπρισ πεδιον (Kupris pedion), meaning Venus' foot (a reference to the Roman goddess Venus). calceolus is Latin for a small shoe.

Cypripedium calceolus sensu stricto ("in the strict sense") does not occur in North America. The closely related Cypripedium parviflorum and C. pubescens are often still referred to as subspecies or varieties of C. calceolus.

Description
This is the largest-flowered orchid species in Europe, growing to 60 cm tall with flowers as wide as 9 cm. Before it flowers, it is distinguished from other orchids by the large size and width of its ovate leaves (as big as 18 cm long, 9 cm wide), which like other orchids exhibit parallel venation. Each shoot has up to four leaves and a small number (1-2) of flowers, which have long often twisted petals varying from red-brown to black (rarely green) and a slipper-shaped yellow labellum, within which red dots are visible. It is a long-lived perennial and spreads using horizontal stems (rhizomes).

Cypripedium calceolus can be confused, when not flowering, with Allium ursinum, Convallaria majalis or several species of Epipactis orchid. It closely resembles other species of Cypripedium orchid native to the United States (see taxonomy, below).

Chromosome number has been given as 2n=20 but also 2n=22

Distribution and habitat
It has a widespread distribution from Europe east through Asia from Spain to the Pacific, including almost every country in Europe plus Russia (European Russia, Siberia, and the Russian Far East), northeastern China (Heilongjiang, Jilin, Liaoning, Nei Mongol), Mongolia, Korea and Rebun Island in Japan.

It is typically found in open woodland on moist calcareous soils. In continental Europe it is also found growing in the decomposed humus of semi-shaded woodland cover on limestone. It has declined over much of the European part of its range, and as a result is legally protected in a number of countries. Its upper elevation limit is 2100m. According to growing instructions provided by Phytesia, it cannot survive waterlogging or direct midday sun.

Ecology
Cypripedium calceolus is frequently associated with stands of hazel trees.

It is pollinated by a number of different insect species, including at least seven species of miner bee in the genera Andrena and Colletes, as well as at least two species of Lasioglossum (furrow bees). Plants are very vulnerable to herbivory by slugs and snails.

Cypripedium calceolus is known to primarily associate with mycorrhizal fungi in the genus Tulasnellaceae. Specific relationships with mycorrhizal fungi are key to orchids' ability to access soil nutrients. Other suggested mycorrhizal partners include Alternaria sp., Ceratorhiza sp., Chaetomium sp., Cylindrocarpon sp., Epicoccum purpureum, Epulorhiza sp., Moniliopsis sp., Mycelium radicis atrovirens, Phoma sp. and Rhizoctonia subtilis sp.

Conservation
Although the global conservation status of Cypripedium calceolus is least concern according to the IUCN Red List, in many countries (including the UK and Denmark) it has become rare and is afforded legal protection. C. calceolus is common in Poland and Austria but in Greece it has become extinct.

In Britain, it was formerly a reasonably widespread plant across northern England, particularly the limestone area of the Yorkshire Dales.  By the late 20th century it had declined to just a single plant in one location in the dales.  While the virtual extinction of the lady's-slipper orchid from its historical range in Britain is often blamed on uprooting by gardeners and botanists, it is also the case that its preferred habitat shrank markedly with human clearance of woodland from the limestone landscape, and the grazing of sheep will have finished it off. It became a protected species in the UK in 1975 under the Conservation of Wild Creatures and Wild Plants Act, but a reintroduction programme for the lady's-slipper orchid is in place, and has led to a population of hundreds of plants as of 2003.

With the help of Dutch plant breeder and wholesaler Anthura, who made the Genus and this species commercially available in garden centers, this species is successfully reintroduced in several locations in Switzerland at the request of the Swiss Orchid Foundation. Seeds from the Swiss population were used by Anthura resulting in three thousand viable plants available for the reintroduction. The locations are kept secret, but are monitored regularly.

Other laboratories and breeders have also developed the technique to mass-produce C. calceolus, so plants are commercially available, unlike many orchid species.

In popular culture
Cypripedium calceolus has appeared on postage stamps in a huge number of countries including Austria, the Czech Republic, Denmark, France, Grenadines, Hungary, Italy, Latvia, Madagascar, Moldova, Mozambique, Norway, Romania, Russia, Slovenia, Sweden, Uganda, Ukraine and the United Kingdom.

The Norwegian municipality of Snåsa has a Cypripedium calceolus in its coat-of-arms.

In Pavel Ivanovich Melnikov's "In the Forests", a znakharka (Russian wise woman) calls this Adam's head, Adam's grass, and Cuckoo's slippers and says it is good for every ill including driving away evil spirits.

References

External links 

 Tela Botanica, Sabot-de-Vénus, Cypripedium calceolus
 Verband Botanischer Garten, Cypripedium calceolus (Frauenschuh) 
 Au Jardin, Le Monde, Sabot de Vénus

calceolus
Orchids of Europe
Orchids of China
Orchids of Japan
Orchids of Korea
Orchids of Russia
Plants described in 1753
Taxa named by Carl Linnaeus
Terrestrial orchids